Eric R. Williams is an American screenwriter, professor, cinematic virtual reality director, and new media storyteller. He is known for developing alternative narrative and documentary techniques that take advantage of digital technologies.

Williams's narrative research emphasizes collaboration between storytellers and their audience. While teaching at Ohio University, Williams began combining aspects of traditional film, theater, and literature with emerging communication technologies such as virtual reality and 360-degree video. In 2020, he and his colleagues wrote a book explaining their techniques, naming this new medium "virtual reality cinema" (or cine-VR).

Early life 
Williams graduated from Northwestern University in 1990 with a bachelor's degree in radio/television/film and a minor in education. He earned his MFA in film from Columbia University, directing the feature film Snakes and Arrows as his thesis. Williams chose Columbia so that he could study writing and producing from James Schamus, Richard Brick, David Shaber and Terry Southern.

Career

Film and television 
Williams' first feature film, Snakes and Arrows, opened the door for him to meet Peter Falk, who hired him to write a Columbo made-for-TV murder mystery for Universal Pictures / Universal Studios in 1998. He later developed and co-produced a pilot for American Movie Classics called Don't Try This At Home.

In the 2000s, Williams worked as a freelance screenwriter and was often hired to write adaptations. Notably, he adapted Luis Alberto Urrea's anthology Across the Wire in 2003; Bill Littlefield's novel The Prospect in 2005; and the anthology Voices from the Heartland in 2008. Williams' work on Voices received the "Ohio Arts Council Award of Individual Excellence in Screenwriting" in 2009. These scripts are shared as examples in his book Screen Adaptation: Beyond the Basics.

By 2010, Williams co-directed and co-produced two documentary television series (Redefining Appalachia and Guyana Pepperpot) as well as the documentary Breaking News (featuring Dianne Rehm, Walter Cronkite and Terry Anderson).

Over the course of ten years as a professor, Williams developed three unique concepts for film and television, publishing two books on the topics:

 Screenwriters taxonomy
 Kortlander-Williams Theme Matrix
 Triangle of knowledge

Academic career
After working as a screenwriter, director and producer for eight years, Williams joined the faculty of Ohio University's Scripps College of Communication in 2005. In addition to a variety of domestic media projects, Williams used his faculty position to work on international media projects in Ukraine, Guyana and Ecuador. 

Williams currently develops virtual reality cinema techniques at Ohio University's Game Research and Immersive Design (GRID) Lab, where he continues to collaborate on a wide variety of non-fiction and narrative-based projects.

Cinematic virtual reality 
Williams began writing, directing and producing virtual reality experiences at Ohio University's Game Research and Immersive Design Lab in 2016. Williams' first narrative virtual reality project was Re:Disappearing, which he wrote and directed that same year.

In collaboration with cinematographer/editor Matt Love and producer/director Carrie Love, Williams developed 360-degree video into a new medium called they deemed cinematic virtual reality (or cine-VR, for short). They used cine-VR techniques on the Medicaid Educational Simulation Project. Their cine-VR approach was said to improve cultural self-efficacy in healthcare providers. After three years of research at Ohio University's Game Research and Immersive Design Lab, Williams and the Loves subsequently wrote the book Virtual Reality Cinema: Narrative Tips and Techniques identifying at least four new concepts for telling stories using cine-VR:

 Persona Gap
 Story Engagement Matrix
 Directorial Control vs Audience Agency
 Blocking, Framing and Editing unique to cine-VR

The authors explain that cine-VR synthesizes concepts from film, theater, literature, virtual reality and video games. Between 2020 and 2021, Williams wrote and/or directed more than half a dozen cine-VR pieces using these techniques, including For the Love of God and Lost Broken Alone. The latter was a finalist for "Best Use of Sound & Music in XR" at the 2020 Real World XR Awards.  Music for the piece was provided by Moby; Jordan Herron was the immersive sound designer. In 2021, For the Love of God won the "Best Virtual Reality Award" in the New York Nil Gallery International Media Festival and "First Place: Outstanding Virtual Reality Film" in the Short Sweet Film Festival.

Williams co-developed the concept of "PRE-ality" (a portmanteau of "prepare" and "reality") while working with emergency room doctors and physical therapists, with whom he worked in Columbus, Ohio and San Francisco, California to implement a training experience for medical students. Williams furthered this research in collaboration with Dr. Petra Williams, Northern Arizona University professor of Physical Therapy, and subsequently introduced the concept of PRE-ality at the Virtual Reality and Healthcare Symposium in Washington, D.C. in 2017.

PRE-ality uses virtual reality cinema to evoke a sense of déjà vu in the viewer to better prepare them for a reality they have yet to experience. This discovery led to the implementation of a virtual reality training experience for healthcare education.

Works 
Williams authored three books: Virtual Reality Cinema (Routledge, 2021 with Matt and Carrie Love), Screen Adaptation (Focal Press, 2017), and The Screenwriters Taxonomy (Routledge, 2017), and edited two others, The Power of Virtual Reality Cinema for Healthcare Training (Routledge, 2021, with John Bowditch) and Media and the Creative Process (Cognella, 2014, with Beth Novak). Williams also wrote and directed for a variety of traditional and new media platforms:

Cine-VR 

 The Chet Story (GRID Lab, 2021) – writer / director
 The Dion Story (GRID Lab, 2021) – writer / director
 For the Love of God (GRID Lab, 2021) – director
 He Loves Me (not) (GRID Lab, 2021) – director
 Moving in Moving On (GRID Lab, 2021) – director
 Diabetes in Appalachia (GRID Lab, 2020) – co-writer / co-director
 Living with Addiction (GRID Lab, 2020) – co-writer / associate producer
 Lost Broken Alone (GRID Lab, 2020) – writer / director
 Re: Disappearing (GRID Lab, 2016) – writer / director

Film and Television 

 Guyana Pepperpot (Blue Arm Productions, 2010) – series producer / segment director
 Breaking News (Blue Arm Productions, 2009) – writer / director
 Redefining Appalachia (WOUB-TV, 2009) – series producer 
 Don’t Try This at Home [TV pilot] (American Movie Classics, 2002) – creator / co-producer
 Colombo and the Curse of Sorcery Circus [un-produced]  (Universal Studios, 1998) – writer
 Snakes & Arrows (Blue Arm Productions, 1996) – co-writer / director

Audio Series 

 TV's New Golden Age (Audible Original, 2021) – writer / host
 How to Appreciate Great Movies (Audible, 2020) – writer / host
 Falling in Love with Romance Films (Audible Original, 2019) – writer / host
 How to View and Appreciate Great Movies (Great Courses, 2018) – writer / host

Books 

 The Power of Virtual Reality Cinema for Healthcare Training (Routledge, 2021)
 Virtual Reality Cinema (Routledge, 2021)
 Screen Adaptation (Focal Press, 2017)
 The Screenwriters Taxonomy (Routledge, 2017)
 Media and the Creative Process (Cognella, 2014)

References

External links 

1061641

Year of birth missing (living people)
Living people
20th-century American screenwriters
21st-century American screenwriters
American male screenwriters
Columbia University School of the Arts alumni
Northwestern University alumni
Ohio University faculty